2nd seed Mikhail Youzhny won his fifth career ATP Challenger Tour title, beating Marco Chiudinelli 6–4, 6–4. This was Youzhny's third consecutive ATP Challenger title, having won the KPN Bangkok Open and the KPN Bangkok Open II in the previous two weeks.

Seeds

Draw

Finals

Top half

Bottom half

References
 Main Draw
 Qualifying Draw

Manila Challenger - Singles